Doen met 'n Miljoen! is the South African Afrikaans language-version of Deal or No Deal. The show was premiered on 19 October 2007 on kykNET and hosted by Casper de Vries.

There are 26 players, each holding a case. The one who wins the quiz round can play the game and win up to 1,000,000 rand (about US$122,000) or down to 1 cent (about 0.12¢). The player selects a case, and the one holding it guesses which value from the remaining ones on board it contains, a small prize will be awarded if he/she is correct.

List of seasons

Case values

Music

"Miljoen" by Lucas Maree

See also
Deal or No Deal (South Africa) – The first South African version of Deal or No Deal, produced by M-Net and in English.

External links
Official website

South African game shows
Deal or No Deal
Afrikaans-language television shows
KykNET original programming
Television shows set in South Africa
2007 South African television series debuts
2009 South African television series endings
2000s South African television series